Somabrachys guillaumei is a moth in the Somabrachyidae family. It was described by Oberthür.

References

Zygaenoidea